Rodney Moore may refer to:
Rodney Moore (British Army officer) (1905–1985), British Army officer
Rodney Moore (boxer) (born 1965), American boxer
Rodney O. Moore (born 1975), Brazilian American engineer 
Rodney W. Moore (born 1963), American politician from the state of North Carolina
Rodney Moore (actor), adult video performer and producer